The Fellowship of Evangelical Baptist Churches in Canada is an Evangelical Baptist association in Canada. It is affiliated with the Evangelical Fellowship of Canada. The national headquarters are located in Guelph, Ontario, Canada. In 2011 Rev. Steven Jones was appointed as President.

History
In 1928, the Union of Regular Baptist Churches of Ontario and Quebec (led by Thomas Todhunter Shields) broke away from the Baptist Convention of Ontario and Quebec, while the Fellowship of Independent Baptist Churches was formed in 1933. These two merged in 1953 to form the FEBCC. The Regular Baptist Missionary Fellowship of Alberta joined in 1963, while the Convention of Regular Baptist Churches of British Columbia (founded 1927) joined in 1965.

In 1995, the Fellowship included over 503 churches with a total membership of over 66,612.

In 2001, the denomination had 71,073 members.

Beliefs 
The denomination has a Baptist confession of faith.

Regions
It is composed of 5 regional fellowships; Fellowship Pacific, Fellowship Prairies, FEB Central, AÉBÉQ and Fellowship Atlantic.

Mission work
The Fellowship of Evangelical Baptist Churches is engaged in missions to Africa, Central Asia, Europe, Japan, Latin America, the Middle East, Pakistan and South America, and offers ministry resources to assist these churches.

Schools
The FEBCC, has strong affiliation with key institutions. Heritage College & Seminary in Cambridge, Ontario, is the main training ground for church leaders across Canada. Northwest Baptist Seminary in Langley, BC, is a partner in Western Canada, SEMBEQ in Quebec.

Publication
The official magazine of the FEBCC, Thrive, is published three times per year.

Convention centre
The Muskoka Bible Centre is affiliated with the FEBCC.

See also
 Baptist
 Baptists in Canada

References

Sources
"Baptists" at The Canadian Encyclopedia,  2010 by Historica-Dominion, Christopher Killacky
http://www.mcmaster.ca/univsec/history.cfm,   2010 McMaster University
Osburn, Wade, 15 November 2009, Vol. 106 Issue 6 Eerdmans Handbook to the History Of Christianity, Lion publishing, 1977
Article Title
http://www.cbmin.org/cbm
The Fellowship Story Our First 25 Years, by Dr. J. H. Watt, 1978
A History of The Baptist Testimony in the Ottawa Area, by C.F Robinson
FEBCC Yearbook
Baptists Around the World, by Albert W. Wardin, Jr.
Four Centuries of Baptist Witness, by H. Leon McBeth

External links
Fellowship of Evangelical Baptist Churches in Canada Home Page
FEBInternational - "the overseas arm of The Fellowship of Evangelical Baptist Churches in Canada"

Christian organizations based in Canada
Baptist denominations in North America
Christian organizations established in 1953
Baptist denominations established in the 20th century
Baptist Christianity in Canada
Evangelical denominations in North America